The 1968 Houston Astros season was a season in American baseball. It involved the Astros finishing in tenth place in the National League, with a record of 72–90, 25 games behind the St. Louis Cardinals.  The Astros also hosted the 1968 MLB All-Star Game at the Astrodome, with the NL defeating the AL, 1–0.

Offseason 
 October 17, 1967: Bob Lillis was released by the Astros.
 October 25, 1967: César Cedeño was signed as an amateur free agent by the Astros.
 November 28, 1967: Doc Edwards was drafted from the Astros by the Philadelphia Phillies in the 1967 minor league draft.

Regular season

Season standings

Record vs. opponents

Notable transactions 
 May 4, 1968: Aaron Pointer was traded by the Astros to the Chicago Cubs for Byron Browne.
 June 8, 1968: Larry Yount was drafted by the Astros in the 5th round of the 1968 Major League Baseball draft.

Roster

Player stats

Batting

Starters by position 
Note: Pos = Position; G = Games played; AB = At bats; H = Hits; Avg. = Batting average; HR = Home runs; RBI = Runs batted in

Other batters 
Note: G = Games played; AB = At bats; H = Hits; Avg. = Batting average; HR = Home runs; RBI = Runs batted in

Pitching

Starting pitchers 
Note: G = Games pitched; IP = Innings pitched; W = Wins; L = Losses; ERA = Earned run average; SO = Strikeouts

Relief pitchers 
Note: G = Games pitched; W = Wins; L = Losses; SV = Saves; ERA = Earned run average; SO = Strikeouts

Farm system

References

External links
1968 Houston Astros season at Baseball Reference

Houston Astros seasons
Houston Astros season
Houston Astro